This article lists all power stations in Cameroon.

Hydroelectric

Thermal

See also 

 List of power stations in Africa
 List of largest power stations in the world
Hydroelectric power in Cameroon

References 

Cameroon
Power stations